Marine Terrace is a road on the southern side of the built up area of Fremantle, Western Australia. It is named for its location alongside the water front.

At various stages in its history it has had significant processions along the terrace.  The trees that currently line the terrace are not found in early photographs.

In 1896 a quarantine station was set up at South Beach, at the end of the road, to process camels shipped in to Western Australia. The camels would arrive at the Long Jetty, be driven along Marine Terrace, and then made to camp at the quarantine site. The animals would later be taken to the Goldfields.

It is bound by Esplanade Park on its west side and has the Esplanade Hotel on the east side, along with a number of other heritage listed buildings.  It is also part of the south west boundary of the Fremantle West End Heritage area.

Intersections

See also

References

External links
 

 
Streets in Fremantle
Fremantle West End Heritage area